Exchange Coffee House may refer to:

Exchange Coffee House, Boston, an early 19th-century hotel and coffeehouse
Exchange Coffee House, Montreal, an early 19th-century hotel and stock trading place

See also
Coffeehouse#Europe, for an overview of coffeehouses as social and business centers
Jonathan's Coffee-House, a London coffeehouse and the original home of the London Stock Exchange
List of former public houses and coffeehouses in Boston